The following is a list of Christian human rights non-governmental organisations (or list of Christian human rights NGOs) that raise awareness about the persecution of Christians and advocates for them. It does not include political parties, or academic institutions.

International non-governmental organizations
Aid to the Church in Need
Blessing Bethlehem
China Aid
Christian Freedom International
Christian Solidarity Worldwide
Christian Solidarity International
 Christian Concern
Open Doors
Release International
Samaritan's Purse
Stefanus Alliance International
Voice of the Martyrs

See also 

Persecution of Christians in the modern era
International Day of Prayer for the Persecuted Church
Antireligious campaigns in China
Asia Bibi blasphemy case
Persecution of Christians in the Eastern Bloc
Persecution of Christians by ISIS

References 

Human rights organizations
Christian advocacy groups
International human rights organizations
Persecution of Christians